Esen is a village in the Belgian province of West Flanders, and a deelgemeente of the city of Diksmuide. It is the home of noted artisanal brewery De Dolle Brouwers.

External links
"The Mad Brewers" or De Dolle Brouwers
Esen @ City Review

Populated places in West Flanders
Sub-municipalities of Diksmuide